The Ingram Collection of Modern British Art is one of the largest and most significant publicly accessible collections of Modern British art in the UK, available to all through a programme of loans and exhibitions. The collection was created by media entrepreneur and philanthropist Chris Ingram. Ingram has been described as “one of the most active and thoughtful collectors of Modern British Art today.”

Robert Upstone (former director of The Fine Art Society and Tate curator) considers the collection to have been "created with exemplary visual flair and an unerring eye for quality". The collection comprises 650 artworks of which over 400 are by the most important artists of the Modern British era, among these Dame Elisabeth Frink, Dame Barbara Hepworth and Sir Eduardo Paolozzi.

The collection
 
The collection spans over a hundred years of British art and includes works in oil and on paper, sculptures, installations and videos. The main focus of the collection is on the art movements which developed in the early and middle decades of the 20th century, art which responded to the influence of the two world wars, and art which challenged the usual and the regular. The collection features a broad base of artists with particularly strong groups of works by William Roberts, Edward Burra, Keith Vaughan, John Tunnard,  John Craxton, and Richard Eurich. The sculpture holdings are significant, featuring works by artists such as, amongst others, Robert Adams, Kenneth Armitage, Reg Butler, Lynn Chadwick, Geoffrey Clarke, Robert Clatworthy, Sir Jacob Epstein, Eric Gill, Bernard Meadows, Eduardo Paolozzi, William Turnbull and Leon Underwood.
 
The Ingram Collection also includes contemporary art, holding works by young and emerging artists as well as those who have now gained international reputations: Haroon Mirza, Suki Chan and Alexander Hoda. In 2016 The Ingram Collection established The Ingram Prize, an annual purchase prize which celebrates and supports the work and early careers of UK art school graduates.

Selected artists from the Ingram Collection

Robert Adams
Eileen Agar
John Aldridge
Sybil Andrews
Maxwell Ashby Armfield
Kenneth Armitage
John Armstrong
Frank Auerbach
Michael Ayrton
John Banting
Edward Bawden
John Bellany
Tony Bevan
David Bomberg
John Boyd
John Bratby
Ralph Brown
Edward Burra
Reg Butler
Sir Anthony Caro
David Carr
Dora Carrington
Lynn Chadwick
Suki Chan
Billy Childish
Geoffrey Clarke
Robert Clatworthy
Cecil Collins
Stephen Conroy
John Craxton
Ken Currie
John Davies
Sir Jacob Epstein
Richard Eurich
Mary Fedden
Paul Feiler
Clifford Fishwick
Donald Hamilton Fraser
Barnet Freedman
Dame Elisabeth Frink
Sir Terry Frost
Henri Gaudier-Brzeska
William Gear
Tom Gentleman
Mark Gertler
Eric Gill
Charles Ginner
Derrick Greaves
Robert Duckworth Greenham
Dame Barbara Hepworth
Josef Herman
Patrick Heron
Tristram Hillier
Roger Hilton
David Hockney
Peter Howson
James Hull
Sir Augustus John
Andrew Johnson
Allen Jones
David Jones
Eric Kennington
R.B. Kitaj
Dame Laura Knight
Jacob Kramer
Henry Lamb
Wyndham Lewis
Alan Lowndes
Peter McLaren
Padraig MacMiadhachain
Christopher Marvell
Bernard Meadows
John Minton
Henry Moore
John Nash
C.R.W. Nevinson 
Mary Newcomb
Ben Nicholson
Winifred Nicholson
Sir Eduardo Paolozzi
Robin Philipson
Glynn Philpot
John Piper
Cyril Power
Dod Procter
Eric Ravilious
Alan Reynolds
Ceri Richards
Ray Richardson
Bridget Riley
William Roberts
Leonard Rosoman
Rosemary Rutherford 
Michael Sandle
William Scott
John Skeaping
Austin Osman Spare
Ruskin Spear
Gilbert Spencer
Stanley Spencer
Blair Hughes Stanton
Graham Sutherland
Margaret Thomas
Julian Trevelyan
John Tunnard
William Turnbull
Leon Underwood
Keith Vaughan
Carel Weight
Bryan Wynter

References

External links

 Description of Collection catalogue

English sculpture
Art museum collections
Sculpture collections
Art collections in the United Kingdom